Pirahan may refer to:
 Pirahan, or perahan, a garment worn in Iran and parts of South Asia; it is a component of the perahan tunban
 Pirahã people, an indigenous people of Brazil
 Pirahã language, their language